Baihe Subdistrict is a subdistrict of Qidong County in Hunan, China. It was one of four subdistricts approved to establish in 2014. Through the amalgamation of village-level divisions in 2016, the subdistrict of Baihe has 7 villages and 11 communities under its jurisdiction, its seat is at Baiyang Road.

Subdivisions 
The subdistrict of Baihe had 23 villages and 11 communities at its establishment in 2014. Its divisions were reduced to 18 from 44 through the amalgamation of villages in 2016, it has 7 villages and 11 communities under its jurisdiction.

7 villages
 Hehua Xincun Village
 Jinxing Village
 Luoyun Village
 Mingluqiao Village
 Paishan Village
 Taihe Village
 Yanshan Village

11 communities
 Baihe Community
 Baijia Community
 Fanfeng Community
 Fengxing Community
 Huanglong Community
 Qianfeng Community
 Tangjia Community
 Taohong Community
 Xiufeng Community
 Zhuanchong Community
 Zuwan Community

References 

Qidong County
Subdistricts of Hunan